Mohamed Ibrahim (born September 8, 1998) is a college football running back for the Minnesota Golden Gophers.

Early life and high school career
Ibrahim was born and grew up in Baltimore, Maryland and attended Our Lady of Good Counsel High School in Olney, Maryland. As a senior, he rushed for 1,313 yards and 16 touchdowns on 206 attempts. He committed to play college football at Minnesota over offers from Kentucky, Iowa, Temple, and Towson.

College career
Ibrahim redshirted his true freshman season. He became the Golden Gophers' starting running back as a redshirt freshman and rushed 202 times for 1,160 yards, the second most by a freshman in history behind Darrell Thompson, and nine touchdowns. Ibrahim was named the MVP of the 2018 Quick Lane Bowl after rushing for 224 yards and two touchdowns against Georgia Tech. As a redshirt sophomore he gained 604 yards and scored seven touchdowns on 114 carries. He entered his redshirt junior season on the watchlist for the Doak Walker Award. Ibrahim finished the season with 1,076 and 15 touchdowns on 201 carries in seven games played and was named first team All-Big Ten and the Ameche–Dayne Running Back of the Year as well as a third team All-American by the Associated Press.

Statistics

Personal life
Ibrahim's father, Mohamed, immigrated to the United States from Nigeria and his mother, Latoya, is a native of Minnesota. He is a practicing Muslim.

References

External links
Minnesota Golden Gophers bio

Living people
American football running backs
Minnesota Golden Gophers football players
Players of American football from Baltimore
1998 births